Elliot Siyabonga Nontshinga (born 4 February 1987) is a South African international footballer who plays as a striker.

Club career
Born in Port Elizabeth, Nontshinga has played for Bay United, Jomo Cosmos, Bloemfontein Celtic, Mpumalanga Black Aces, FC Buffalo, Roses United and Santos.

International career
Nontshinga received his first call-up to the South African national team in November 2011, which he dedicated to the memory of his mother.

He made his national team debut for South Africa in 2011, earning three caps between then and 2012.

References

1987 births
Living people
Sportspeople from Port Elizabeth
South African soccer players
South Africa international soccer players
Bay United F.C. players
Jomo Cosmos F.C. players
Bloemfontein Celtic F.C. players
Mpumalanga Black Aces F.C. players
F.C. Buffalo (South Africa) players
Roses United F.C. players
Santos F.C. (South Africa) players
South African Premier Division players
Association football forwards
Soccer players from the Eastern Cape